MAOC or MaoC may refer to:
 Milicias Antifascistas Obreras y Campesinas,  a militia group founded in the Second Spanish Republic in 1934
 Maritime Analysis and Operations Centre, an anti-drug trafficking agency active since 2006
 Enoyl-CoA hydratase 2 or MaoC, an enzyme